Two highways in the U.S. state of Nevada have been signed as Route 50:
U.S. Route 50 in Nevada
Nevada State Route 50 (1935), which existed until the 1970s renumbering